The Family of Verona (Italian: da Verona) was a noble Italian family originally from Verona. The family descended from the Lombards, and are most notable as the ruling house of the Triarchy of Negroponte, established on the island of Euboea in Greece, between 1205 and 1470.

Members 

Giberto I da Verona
Alberto da Verona
Guglielmo da Verona 
Giberto II da Verona
Guglielmo da Verona
Francesco da Verona
Beatrice da Verona
Guglielmo II da Verona
Margherita da Verona 
Felisa da Verona 
Porzia da Verona 
Francesco I da Verona  
Corrado Lorea 
Agnese da Verona 
Francesco da Verona 
Boniface da Verona 
Marulla da Verona 
Helena da Verona 
Tommaso da Verona
Paul da Verona
Joseph of Verona
Edward of Verona

Sources